Milliyet Çocuk was a Turkish language children's magazine which existed between 1972 and 1990.

History and profile
Milliyet Çocuk was launched in 1972. The magazine was part of Milliyet group which was owned by Karacan family and produced Milliyet newspaper. Milliyet Çocuk was a supplement to Milliyet until 1974 when it became an independent publication. It featured several cartoon serials such as Larry Yuma by Carlo Boscarato and Claudio Nizzi and Lucky Luke by Morris and René Goscinny. The magazine folded in 1976 due to the low circulation levels. Next year Milliyet Çocuk was restarted as a weekly magazine, and the founding editor-in-chief was a Turkish poet, Ülkü Tamer. The magazine became success soon after its restart and sold nearly 100,000 copies. In the second period Milliyet Çocuk featured work by significant literary figures. The magazine folded in 1990.

References

1972 establishments in Turkey
1990 disestablishments in Turkey
Children's magazines
Defunct magazines published in Turkey
Magazines established in 1972
Magazines disestablished in 1990
Magazines published in Istanbul
Newspaper supplements
Turkish-language magazines
Weekly magazines published in Turkey